Hosford (also spelled Horsford) is a name of English origin. It may refer to:

People
Chauncey Hosford, Oregon pioneer.
Edward Columbus Hosford, American architect
Henry Hosford Gurley, Congressman from Louisiana
Kyle Hosford, Irish basketball player
Robert Flournoy Hosford, Florida politician

Other
Hosford-Abernethy, Portland, Oregon, a neighborhood
Hosford yield criterion, a physics equation
John Hosford House, a historic building in Ohio
Hosford, Florida, community in Liberty County, Florida